This is a list of books related to space art.

The Art of Space  Ron Miller, 2014
The Beauty of Space  Edited by Jon Ramer, foreword by Alan Bean, 2011
Blueprint for Space Frederick I. Ordway, III & Randy Liebermann, eds
Celestial Visitations: The Art of Gilbert Williams Pomegranate artbooks, 1979
The Conquest of Space  Chesley Bonestell, Willy Ley, Viking Press, 1950
Cosmic Art Ramond & Lila Piper Hawthorne Books, 1975
Cycles of Fire William Hartmann & Ron Miller, Aurium Press, 1987
Eyewitness to Space, from the Art Program of the National Aeronautics and Space Administration (1963 to 1969).' Foreword by J. Carter Brown. Preface by Thomas O. Paine. New York: H.N. Abrams
Fire and Ice: A History Of Comets in Art. Roberta J. M. Olson. Walker and Company New York
The Fires Within: Volcanoes on Earth and Other Planets David A. Hardy & John Murray Dragon's World, 1991
Futures: 50 Years in Space David A. Hardy & Patrick Moore AAPPL 2004
The Grand Tour: A Traveler's Guide to the Solar System  Ron Miller and William Hartmann, Workman Publishers, 1981, 1993, 2005
Imagining Space Achievements*Predictions*Possibilities 1950-2050 Chronicle Books 2001
Infinite Worlds Vincent Di Fate
Infinite Worlds: An Illustrated Voyage to Planets Beyond Our Sun Ray Villard & Lynette Cook, University of California Press, 2005
In the Stream of Stars: The Soviet-American Space Art Book Sokolov, Miller, Myagkov, Hartmann, International Association for the Astronomical Arts
NASA ART 50 Years of Exploration James Dean & Bertram Ulrich Abrams, 2008
Our World in Space Robert McCall & Isaac Asimov, New York Graphic Society LTD 1974
Out of the Cradle: Exploring the Frontiers beyond Earth, William K. Hartmann, Ron Miller and Pamela Lee (Workman Publishing, 1984)
Space Art - Starlog photo guidebook, Ron Miller - Starlog Magazine, 1978
Space Art: How to draw and paint planets, moons and landscapes of alien worlds  Michael Carroll, Watson Guptill publishers 2007
Star Struck: One Thousand Years of the art of Science and Astronomy Ronald Brashear Daniel Lewis 2001 Univ. of Washington Press
Sur Les Autres Mondes Lucien Rudaux, Librairie Larousse, 1937
The Impact of American and Russian Cosmism on the Representation of Space Exploration in 20th Century American and Soviet Space Art Kornelia Boczkowska, Wydawnictwo Naukowe UAM, 2016
Universe  Don Dixon Houghton Mifflin 1981
Universe Guidebook, The Celestial Zoo, Pablo Carlos Budassi, 2020
Visions of Spaceflight Images from the Ordway collection Frederick I. Ordway III Four Walls Eight Windows, New York 2000
Visions of Space  David A. Hardy Paper Tiger 1989
Worlds Beyond: The Art of Chesley Bonestell Ron Miller & Frederick C. Durant, III

See also
List of space artists

Books
Lists of books